Menathais intermedia is a species of sea snail, a marine gastropod mollusk, in the family Muricidae, the murex snails or rock snails.

References

 Claremont, M., Vermeij, G. J., Williams, S. T. & Reid, D. G. (2013). Global phylogeny and new classification of the Rapaninae (Gastropoda: Muricidae), dominant molluscan predators on tropical rocky seashores. Molecular Phylogenetics and Evolution. 66: 91–102.

External links
 [httpsKiener, L. C. (1835-1837). Spécies général et iconographie des coquilles vivantes. Vol. 8. Famille des Purpurifères. Première partie. Genres Cassidaire, (Cassidaria), Lamarck, pp. 1-10, pl. 1-2]://www.biodiversitylibrary.org/item/19859

intermedia
Gastropods described in 1836